Periploca is a genus of plants in the family Apocynaceae, first described for modern science by Linnaeus in 1753. It is native to Europe, Asia, and Africa.

Species
 Periploca aphylla Decne. - Middle East from Sinai to Pakistan
 Periploca calophylla (Wight) Falc. - S China, Nepal, Bhutan, Assam, E Himalayas, Vietnam
 Periploca chevalieri Browicz - Cape Verde Islands
 Periploca chrysantha D.S. Yao, X.D. Chen & J.W. Ren - Gansu Province in China
 Periploca floribunda Tsiang - Yunnan, Vietnam
 Periploca forrestii Schltr. - Guangxi, Guizhou, Qinghai, Sichuan, Tibet, Yunnan, India, Kashmir, Myanmar, Nepal
 Periploca graeca L. - Mediterranean
 Periploca hydaspidis Falc. - Kashmir
 Periploca laevigata Aiton - Canary Islands, Savage Islands
 Periploca linearifolia Quart.-Dill. & A. Rich - Ethiopia
 Periploca nigrescens Afzel. - W Africa
 Periploca refractifolia Gilli -  Tanzania
 Periploca sepium Bunge - widespread across much of China
 Periploca tsiangii D. Fang & H.Z. Ling - Guangxi Province in China
 Periploca visciformis (Vatke) K. Schum. -  Somalia
formerly included

See also
Cyprinia a closely related plant

References

 Browicz, K. (1966). The genus Periploca L. A monograph. Arbor. Kórnickie 11: 5–104.
 USDA Plants database
 UniProt Taxonomy database
 
 

Apocynaceae genera
Vines
Taxa named by Joseph Pitton de Tournefort
Periplocoideae